= Transitus (education) =

Transitus is the name given to a year in a number of independent schools in Scotland. As the name would suggest, this year is offered as a bridge between 'primary' and 'secondary' education.

Transitus replaces the final year of primary education used in state schools, often referred to as Primary 7 (P7). In preparatory schools, it may also share the 'P7' designation, although in this case it is instead the abbreviation of 'Prep'.
